Duncan Tonatiuh (born 1984) is a Mexican-American author and illustrator of several award-winning children's books. The illustrations in his books are influenced by Pre-Columbian art. The themes in his stories relate to the Latino experience, with subjects that include social justice issues, art, history, and immigration. He is an advocate and activist for workers’ rights.

Early life 
Tonatiuh was born in 1984 in Mexico City to an American father and a Mexican mother and was raised in San Miguel de Allende, Mexico. He moved to the United States as a teenager and completed high school at Buxton School in Massachusetts. As a child, he was inspired by comics and anime to write and illustrate his own superhero stories. In high school, he became interested in painting, finding inspiration in the works of Vincent van Gogh and Egon Schiele.

Career 
In 2008, Tonatiuh received his B.F.A. from Parsons School of Design in Manhattan and a B.A. from Eugene Lang College. While in college, he became interested in Mixtec artwork, specifically Mixtec codex. His senior thesis, Journey of a Mixteco, won best thesis and was published online. Immediately after graduating, he was contracted by Abrams Books for Young Children, publishing his first book Dear Primo in 2010. He divides his time between Mexico and the U.S., visiting schools, libraries, and bookstores. He is a workers’ rights activist.

Books 
Dear Primo: A Letter to My Cousin (2010) is about two cousins who live in the United States and Mexico and how their lives are similar yet different. The book shows how life is different for these two cousins, Charlie and Carlitos. It also talks about how their lives might be different but how they are both very similar people.

Diego Rivera: His World and Ours (May 2011) concerns the life of Diego Rivera. It is summarized for young people to read. It talks about his journey to being one of the most famous painters in the world. Tonatiuh also wants young readers to think about what Diego Rivera would be like today if he were alive.

Pancho Rabbit and Coyote (May 7, 2013) is about a young rabbit (Pancho) who is waiting for his Papa's return from working in the carrot and lettuce fields up north to earn money for his family. Pancho becomes impatient and sets out on a journey to find his father. He packs his Papa's favorite meal, mole, rice, beans, tortillas, and aguamiel. He eventually finds a coyote who is willing to travel with him in exchange for food. When the food is all gone, the coyote is still hungry and eats Pancho. This book helps shine a light on the struggles that many families go through to have a better life.

Separate Is Never Equal: Sylvia Mendez and Her Family's Fight (May 6, 2014): About ten years before Brown v. Board of Education, Sylvia Mendez was denied the right to go to a "Whites only" school in California. She and her parents brought together the Hispanic community and filed a lawsuit that was in the federal district court. They eventually ended school segregation in California.

Funny Bones: Posada and His Day of the Dead Calaveras (2015) is about how the calaveras (skeletons), who performed everyday and festive activities, came to be. José Guadalupe Posada drew political cartoons because there was no freedom of speech. His calavera drawings are best known for Día de los Muertos (Day of the Dead).

In Salsa (2015), Jorge Argueta, Elisa Amando, and Duncan Tonatiuh bring together an easy and delicious recipe for salsa. The salsa includes tomatoes as bongos and kettledrums, onion, marca, garlic, cilantro and the trumpets, and the conductor.

The Princess and the Warrior: A Tale of Two Volcanoes (2016): Princess Izta had many people who wanted to marry her. When Popoca, a warrior, came along and promised to love her and be true to her, she fell in love. In order for Princess Izta and Popoca to get married, the emperor told him that he needed to defeat their enemy, Jaguar Claw. His challenger sent a message to Princess Izta saying he was dead when he was still alive and about to defeat Jaguar Claw. Princess Izta then went into a very deep sleep and couldn't be woken by anyone. It is a story of how two volcanoes were formed, Iztaccíhuatl (who sleeps) and Popocatépetl (who tries to wake her by ash and smoke).

Awards
2011 Pura Belpré Medal – honor for illustration
2011 Américas Award Commendation

Diego Rivera: His World and Ours
2012 Pura Belpré Medal winner for illustration
2012 Tomás Rivera Mexican-American Children's Book Award

Pancho Rabbit and the Coyote: A Migrant's Tale
2014 Pura Belpré Medal – honor for illustration
2014 Pura Belpré Medal – honor for narrative
2014 Tomás Rivera Mexican-American Children's Book Award 
2014 Américas Award Honor

Separate is Never equal: Sylvia Méndez & Her Family's Fight for Desegregation
2015 Pura Belpré Medal – honor for illustration
2015 Tomás Rivera Mexican-American Children's Book Award
2015 Jane Addams Award
2015 Robert F. Sibert Informational Books Medal
2015 Américas Award
2015 Carter G. Woodson Book Award

Funny Bones: Posada and His Day of the Dead Calaveras
2015 New York Times Best Illustrated Children's Books
2016 Robert F. Sibert Informational Book Medal
2016 Tomás Rivera Mexican-American Children's Book Award
2016 Pura Belpré Medal – honor for illustration
2016 Américas Award Honor

Salsa: Un poema para cocinar / A Cooking Poem
2016 Américas Award Commendation

Esquivel: Space-Age Sound Artist
2017 Pura Belpré Medal – honor for illustration

The Princess and the Warrior
2017 Pura Belpré Medal – honor for illustration
2017 Américas Award Commendation
2017 Charlotte Zolotow Award Commendation

Danza!: Amalia Hernández and el Ballet Folklórico de México
2018 Américas Award

Undocumented: A Worker's Fight
2019 Américas Award

Soldier for Equality: José de la Luz Sáenz and the Great War
2020 Pura Belpré Medal – honor for author

Bibliography

Illustrator and author 
 Dear Primo: A Letter To My Cousin, Abrams Books for Young Readers (New York, N.Y.) 2010.
 Diego Rivera: His World and Ours, Abrams Books for Young Readers (New York, N.Y.) 2011.
 Pancho Rabbit and the Coyote: A Migrant's Tale, Abrams Books for Young Readers (New York, N.Y.) 2013.
 Separate is never equal: Sylvia Méndez & Her Family's Fight for Desegregation, Abrams Books for Young Readers (New York, N.Y.) 2014.
 Funny Bones: Posada and His Day of the Dead Calaveras, Abrams Books for Young Readers (New York, N.Y.) 2015.
 The Princess and the Warrior: A Tale of Two Volcanoes, Abrams Books for Young Readers (New York, N.Y.) 2016.
 Soldier for Equality: José de la Luz Sáenz and the Great War, Abrams Books for Young Readers (New York, N.Y.) 2019.
 Esquivel! Space-Age Sound Artist written by Susan Wood, Charlesbridge (Watertown, MA) 2016.

Illustrator 
 Salsa: Un poema para cocinar / A Cooking Poem written by Jorge Argueta, Groundwood Books/House of Anansi Press (Toronto, ON) 2015.

References

External links 

 http://www.duncantonatiuh.com/

1984 births
Living people
American artists of Mexican descent
Carter G. Woodson Book Award winners
American children's book illustrators
Mexican illustrators
Mexican writers
Parsons School of Design alumni
Eugene Lang College alumni
People from San Miguel de Allende
Writers from Mexico City
Buxton School (Massachusetts) alumni
Robert F. Sibert Informational Book Medal winners